Eight ships of the Royal Navy have been named HMS Intrepid:
  was a 64-gun third rate, previously the French ship Sérieux. She was captured in 1747 and broken up by 1765.
  was a 64-gun third rate launched in 1770, used for harbour service from 1810 and sold in 1828.
  was a 16-gun sloop launched in 1780. She foundered in 1800.
  was a wooden screw discovery sloop, previously the civilian Free Trade, launched in 1847. The Navy purchased her in 1850 and briefly named her HMS Perseverance; it renamed her HMS Intrepid later in 1850. She was abandoned in the Arctic in 1854.
  was a wooden screw gunvessel launched in 1855 and sold in 1864.
  was an  protected cruiser launched in 1891. She was converted to a minelayer in 1910 and was sunk as a blockship in the Zeebrugge raid in 1918.
  was an  launched in 1936 and sunk by air attack in 1943.
  was a  launched in 1964. She was laid up in 1991 and used for spare parts before being sent for scrapping in 2008.

Battle honours
The ships named HMS Intrepid have amassed a sizeable number of battle honours.

 Minorca 1756
 Lagos 1759
 Quiberon 1759
 Havana 1762
 Martinique 1780
 Chesapeake 1781
 St Kitts 1782
 Toulon 1793
 Martinique 1809
 Zeebrugge 1918
 Atlantic 1939–41
 Dunkirk 1940
 Norway 1940
 Bismarck 1941
 Arctic 1941–43
 Malta Convoys 1942
 Sicily 1943
 Salerno 1943
 Aegean 1943
 Falkland Islands 1982

Citations

Royal Navy ship names